Guangshui railway station is a station on Beijing–Guangzhou railway in Guangshui, Suizhou, Hubei.

History
The former Guangshui railway station was established in 1902. In 2007, the section of Beijing–Guangzhou railway near the border between Henan and Hubei was diverted to a more straight route in order to meet the requirements of the sixth "Speed-Up" campaign of China Railway and the current station was built along the new route. The former Guangshui railway station was renamed as Guangshuixi railway station.

References

Railway stations in Hubei
Stations on the Beijing–Guangzhou Railway
Railway stations in China opened in 2007